Mordon Malitoli (born 5 August 1968) is a former Zambia international football defender who played for clubs in Zambia, Zanzibar and Finland.

Playing career
Born in Mufulira, Malitoli began playing club football for local side Nkana F.C. In over a decade with the club, he won seven Zambian Premier League titles, five Zambian Cup titles and finished second in the 1990 African Cup of Champions Clubs.

Later in his career, Malitoli played in Zanzibar with Malindi F.C. and in Finland with Rovaniemen Palloseura.

Malitoli made several appearances for the senior Zambia national football team, including six FIFA World Cup qualifying matches, and he participated in the 1994,  1996 and 1998 African Cup of Nations finals.

Personal
Malitoli was the fifth of eight children and his brother, Kenneth, is also a former Zambia international footballer.

References

External links

1968 births
Living people
Zambian footballers
Zambia international footballers
1994 African Cup of Nations players
1996 African Cup of Nations players
1998 African Cup of Nations players
Veikkausliiga players
Nkana F.C. players
Rovaniemen Palloseura players
Zambian expatriate footballers
Expatriate footballers in Finland
Association football defenders